The Royal Albatross is a privately owned, four-masted Barquentine, luxury super yacht. She operates from her home berth at Resorts World Sentosa on the island of Sentosa in Singapore. The Royal Albatross is a unique luxury tall ship with four masts, 22-sails, more than 200 ropes, three decks and is comparable with a luxury yacht; but unlike the typical super-yacht, it looks and operates like an old-world galleon. Her sails and rigging were designed by Jim Barry who designed the ship for the Pirates of the Caribbean movies. After a 5.5 year reconstruction, the Royal Albatross is one of Singapore's premier hospitality venues with a passenger capacity of 200 (alongside) and 149 (sailing) all of which can be accommodated on a continuous upper deck.

The Royal Albatross started its life in Chicago where it was known as Windy II, cruising the Great Lakes prior to a journey in 2008 that brought her over 15,000 kilometres from the temperate climates of North America to the tropical waters of South East Asia. She was the first U.S. certified four-masted Barquentine since 1920.

Since arriving in Singapore, approximately 360,000 man hours were invested in re-designing, re-fitting and certifying the Royal Albatross to operate commercially in Singapore and beyond. Her current specifications features 22 sails, 650 square meters of canvas, and over 60,000 RGB lights.

Background 
In 2001, the Royal Albatross was first launched as Windy II, the twin sister of tall ship Windy and operated on the Great Lakes from Navy Pier in Chicago. Windy II was renamed the Royal Albatross in 2011.

In 2008, when the Royal Albatross first arrived in Singapore, she was certified by the U.S. Coastguard and was licensed to carry a maximum of 150 passengers. However, the Marine Port Authority of Singapore did not recognize the license granted under the U.S. Coastguard and agreed to issue a license to sail in Singapore waters but with a limit of 60 persons onboard.

In 2009, an extensive transformation process started for the Royal Albatross when she was moved to Lumut, Perak, Malaysia to undergo hull strengthening, steel fabrication, ventilation works, exterior carpentry and engine room fitting. She was essentially stripped to her bare hull and then rebuilt. There were no regional shipyards with tall ship experience so facilities were rented and an international team of experts was recruited to advise, manage and train a new crew to work on the ship. The reconstruction process in Lumut lasted 2 years before the Royal Albatross was moved to begin her next phase of construction.

In 2011, the Royal Albatross moved to Puteri Harbour in Johor, Malaysia to begin works on her electrical systems, internal piping and interior carpentry. The process took another 2 years before moving back to Singapore for the final stage of the reconstruction.

In 2013, the Royal Albatross moved to Raffles Marina in Singapore to complete her 6 year transformation process with detailing, furnishing, and crew training. She also attained her certifications in 2013. The Royal Albatross was rebuilt from the ground up to be a luxury super yacht while maintaining her traditional Barquentine Class A certification while complying with RINA class, International Load-line and passenger safety requirements of the Marine Port Authority of Singapore (MPA).

Royal Albatross is certified as a commercial passenger ship in Singapore and international waters under the RINA Certification and is licensed by MPA to carry 162 passengers on board.

Capacity & Specifications 

Capacity
12 Crew including accommodation
Day Sailing: 149 Guests (excluding crew)
Alongside: 180 Guests
Overnight Charter: 10 Guests

Specifications
Original built year: 2001
Reconstruction year: 2008-2014
Flag: LIYR (Malaysia)
Hull: Steel
Displacement: 276 tons
Length: 47 m
Length on deck: 34 m
Beam: 7.6 m
Draft: 3.8 m
Type: Barquentine Tall Ship (Class-A)
Class: RINA Yacht
Masts: 4 Aluminum masts
Sails: 22 (653 sq.meters)
Rig: Staysail (w/square sail)
Air draft: 28.5m
Engine: Cummins 1 X 430 HP

Private Charters 
The Royal Albatross is available for private charter inside and outside of Singapore waters. She has four en-suite queen cabins and a king size owner's Cabin, for a total of 10 guests plus 12 crew. There are also diving facilities and a moon pool.

The Royal Albatross has been chartered for private parties, public events, solemnization's, weddings, product launches, press conferences, team-building, and corporate events. The Royal Albatross has a large open (unobstructed) upper deck, 3 stages with professional sound systems to host events and ceremonies. She also features a commercial restaurant grade galley (kitchen) with stone hearth pizza ovens. The Royal Albatross offers clients the option to decorate the ship and even customize the sails with logos which can be used during their events.

Awards and recognition 
In 2017, the Royal Albatross received recognition at the Maritime and Shipping Awards 2017 and was awarded the APAC Excellence Award: Best Unique Superyacht.

In 2022, the Royal Albatross received the Outstanding Attraction Award, along with Mandai Wildlife Reserve, at the Singapore Tourism Awards 2022.

Notable Appearances 
The Royal Albatross has appeared as locations for several movies and TV shows. Notable appearances includes:

 As Bruce Wayne's super yacht in The Dark Knight by Christopher Nolan.
 Super yacht in Singapore's Channel 8 TV series drama My Guardian Angel

Gallery

See also

 Royal Clipper
 Flying Clipper
 Star Flyer
 List of large sailing vessels

References

External links 
Royal Albatross website

2001 ships
Tall ships
Four-masted ships
Barquentines
Schooners
Ships of Singapore
Ships built in Charleston, South Carolina
Individual sailing yachts
2000s sailing yachts
2008 establishments in Singapore
Entertainment venues in Singapore
Tourist attractions in Singapore
Resorts World Sentosa